Knowledge and its Limits, a 2000 book by philosopher Timothy Williamson, argues that the concept of knowledge cannot be analyzed into a set of other concepts; instead, it is sui generis. Thus, though knowledge requires justification, truth, and belief, the word "knowledge" cannot be accurately regarded as simply shorthand for "justified true belief". It initiated a whole new approach to epistemology, generally referred to as knowledge-first epistemology.

See also
 Gettier problem
 knowledge
 epistemology

References

Epistemology literature
2000 non-fiction books